"Covenant" is a 2014 science fiction short story by Elizabeth Bear. It was first published in the anthology Hieroglyph.

Synopsis
A former serial killer — the beneficiary of "rightminding", a process that cures psychopathy by forcibly bestowing empathy — finds herself in a very dangerous situation.

Reception
"Covenant" was a finalist for the 2015 Locus Award for Best Short Story. SF Signal considered it to be 'suspenseful' and 'fairly riveting', with '(a)n interesting premise'. Daniel Keys Moran stated that the story made him "wish [he] were a member of SFWA, so [he] could vote [for it] on the Nebulas."

References

External links
Text of the story, at Slate

2014 short stories
Science fiction short stories
Works by Elizabeth Bear